Audio induction loop systems, also called audio-frequency induction loops (AFILs) or hearing loops, are an assistive listening technology for individuals with reduced ranges of hearing.

A hearing loop consists of one or more physical loop of cable which are placed around a designated area, usually a room or a building. The cable generates an electromagnetic field throughout the looped space which can be picked up by a telecoil-equipped hearing aid, a cochlear implant (CI) processor, or a specialized hand-held hearing loop receiver for individuals without telecoil-compatible hearing aids.

The loops carry baseband audio-frequency currents; no carrier signal is used. The benefit is that it allows the sound source of interestwhether a musical performance or a ticket taker's side of the conversationto be transmitted to the hearing-impaired listener clearly and free of other distracting noise in the environment. Typical installation sites include concert halls, ticket kiosks, high-traffic public buildings (for PA announcements), auditoriums, places of worship, courtrooms, meeting rooms, and homes.

In the United Kingdom, as an aid for disability, their provision, where reasonably possible, is required by the Equality Act 2010 and previously by the Disability Discrimination Act 1995, and they are available in "the back seats of all London taxis, which have a little microphone embedded in the dashboard in front of the driver; at 18,000 post offices in the U.K.; at most churches and cathedrals", according to Prof. David G. Myers.

In the United States, an alternative technology using FM transmission to "neck loop" receivers was more widely adopted due to economic advantages. In comparison, hearing loop systems require a greater initial investment by the facility operator, but offer greater convenience and avoid the social stigma and hygienic concerns entailed by the FM system's paraphernalia for those who have hearing aids.

Another alternative system, used primarily in theatres, uses invisible infrared radiation; compatible headsets can pick up the modulated infrared energy to reproduce sound.

History
The first patented magnetic induction loop communication system was invented by Joseph Poliakoff (grandfather of Sir Martyn Poliakoff) in Great Britain in 1937.

The pickup coil in a hearing aid is known as a telecoil (or T-coil) because its early form was to pick up a magnetic field from coils within a telephone. These were included as a part of the method of enabling a two-way conversation over a single pair of wires. The telecoil enabled the hearing aid user to hear the phone conversation clearly without picking up background noise.

From this, the natural development was to generate electromagnetic fields representing the audio, which the telecoil could receive.

Induction loop theory
The simplest form of AFIL is a single wire around a room, driven from a power amplifier as a loudspeaker would be driven. The coupling of magnetic fields is described mathematically by Faraday's law of induction. A summary of the theory necessary for AFILs is included in British Standard BS 7594, which is a guide to the design and installation of induction loops.

Practical induction loops
A basic form of AFIL using a general purpose amplifier, as described above, have some disadvantages. The loop driver amplifier requires some additional circuits to overcome these. Using anything other than a correctly designed loop driver amplifier is not only unsatisfactory, but may result in a loop installation that can generate harmonics when driven into distortion, and these will cause radio interference. This must be prevented, both for sound quality and for legal reasons as it is illegal to cause such interference in these circumstances. In Europe, the EMC Directive applies, and it is also illegal to supply or install unsuitable electronic and electrical equipment.

A second factor is that many forms of hearing impairment mean that sound levels must be kept fairly constant. An effective loop driver will have an automatic level control to compress the signal, providing a constant loop amplitude for a wide range of source levels. Meeting this requirement is likely to meet the interference requirement at the same time. To do this, the loop driver should give constant output for at least 30 dB input range.

A third problem is the inductance of the loop cable, and its effect upon the higher frequencies of sound. To overcome this, many loop drivers operate as current mode amplifiers instead of voltage mode. By setting the amplifier characteristic between voltage and current mode, the overall performance is optimised for good bandwidth with minimum distortion. There are other options for reducing the effect of cable inductance, including the use of a multi-core cable where the conductors are connected in parallel.

Structural steel and other metalwork in buildings can cause problems by reducing the field strength unevenly across the loop area, causing frequency distortions. In most cases, a solution can be found using combinations of loops with phase shift between them, combined with frequency correction and increased signal strength.

There are many different ways to configure conductive loops to give different patterns of magnetic fields and solve different technical problems such as the presence of metal structures.

Other equipment within the magnetic field
Audio induction loops create relatively high magnetic field levels. Other equipment must be designed and installed to work properly within this field.

The most common cause of problems is earth loops, where different pieces of equipment are connected together by signal wires, but powered from different power sockets in different parts of the room or building. The combination of the mains earth and signal earth creates a receiving loop that produces an interference signal proportional to the area within the earth loop. Various steps are used to prevent interference on audio and video equipment. Powering signal sources and output devices from the same mains circuit to prevent formation of an earth loop; shielded cables or signal isolators may be used.

Technical standards
An objective of the field strength requirements of standards for AFILs is to make the perceived loudness of sound from the loop the same as from the microphone in the hearing aid. This is the basis of the average field strength of 100mA/m used to generate today's performance standards around the world.

IEC 60118-4 (formerly Britain's BS 6083 part 4, also known as EN 60118-4) is now the main specification for international use. This is based on the principle that the long term average of the field strength at a typical listening location must be 100mA/m, +- 3 dB. To determine this long term average requires a measurement over 60 seconds or more. The standard therefore sets a more pragmatic requirement for determining the short term peaks of the signal. Short term peaks need to be 12 dB (x4) higher than the long term average, based on the fact that peaks of speech are approximately 12 dB higher than the long term average level of speech. Therefore, an induction loop system or AFILS must be capable of delivering field strength peaks of 400mA/m +- 3 dB (280 to 560mA/m). Peaks must be measured using fast RMS measurement (125ms averaging time).

In addition the IEC 60118-4 standard sets limits on acceptable background noise, and requires that the system delivers frequency response of +- 3 dB from 100 Hz to 5 kHz relative to the field strength at 1 kHz. All measurements must be made with a coil that picks up only the vertical component of the magnetic field, the component that is picked up by the telecoil of a hearing aid.

BS 7594 (published by the BSI and widely used in Britain) is a non-mandatory guideline for the design and installation of induction loops. It has a comprehensive guide to theory, as well as guidance for those considering the installation of AFILs in buildings for which they may be responsible. It also contains some valuable guidance relating to other equipment within the loop area. The calibration of field strength measuring devices is also included.

References 

Hearing aids
Assistive technology
Augmentative and alternative communication

fi:Induktiosilmukka